The Maale people (also spelled Male; pronounced /ˈmɑːli/), are a small ethnic group of approximately 95,000 located in the Southern Nations, Nationalities, and People's Region at the border between north and south Omo of Ethiopia.

The Maale people are maintaining their language vigorously, despite exposure to outside pressures and languages.

Culture

Many of the practices related to the women of the Maale have been documented by Thubauville (2010), including the differences between traditional and contemporary practices.

They have a gender called ashtime. There are opposing scholarly interpretations of the role and significance of this. Epprecht believes that they are male assigned at birth individuals who behave as women and also have sex with men. But he admits that the description by Donham (who had actually lived and worked among the Maale), is quite different, that the duty of an ashtime was to allow the king to have sex "protected from even the merest whiff of female sexuality at key moments in the ritual life of the nation".

References

Relevant Literature
Donham, Donald L. "History at one point in time: 'working together' in Maale 1975." American Ethnologist 12.2 (1985): 262–284.
Donham, Donald. "From ritual kings to Ethiopian landlords in Maale." The Southern Marches of Imperial Ethiopia (1986): 69–95.
Donham, Donald L. "Revolution and modernity in Maale: Ethiopia, 1974 to 1987." Comparative Studies in Society and History 34.01 (1992): 28–57.
Donham, Donald L. "An archaeology of work among the Maale of Ethiopia." Man (1994): 147–159.
Donham, Donald Lewis. 1994. Work and Power in Maale, Ethiopia. Columbia University Press.
Thubauville, Sophia. 2010. Die Wandernde ist eine Kuh: Lebenswege von Frauen in Maale, Südäthiopien. Köln: Rüdiger Köppe Verlag.  
Thubauville, Sophia. 2014. "'The Impure Outsider': Ritual Exclusion and Integration of Women in Maale, Southern Ethiopia." Northeast African Studies Volume 14, Number 2: 145–158.

Ethnic groups in Ethiopia
Omotic-speaking peoples